Paul Chan Wai Chi (born 4 January 1957) is a Macau politician, who is the President of New Democratic Macau Association and a member of the Legislative Assembly of Macau. He is one of the three pro-democracy lawmakers in Macau.

Chan graduated from Yuet Wah College. In 2009, he participated in the legislative election in the candidate list led by Antonio Ng, and won the third seat for the Macau democracy camp.

Election results

See also
 List of members of the Legislative Assembly of Macau

References

1957 births
Living people
Members of the Legislative Assembly of Macau
New Macau Association politicians